The Episcopal Missionary Church (EMC) is a Continuing Anglican church body in the United States and a member of the Federation of Anglican Churches in the Americas. Its founding in the early 1990s can be traced to the protests of members of the Episcopal Church who were concerned that their church had become massively influenced by secular humanism (i.e., liberal theologies). At first, these clergy and laymen sought to change the direction of their church by working from within it, to which end they formed a voluntary association, the Episcopal Synod of America.

When they later concluded that this approach would not succeed, a new missionary diocese was formed by them, still attempting to remain within ECUSA. In 1992, however, the missionary diocese withdrew from ECUSA and formed a separate church, the Episcopal Missionary Church. A. Donald Davies, retired ECUSA Bishop of Dallas and Fort Worth, was named the first Presiding Bishop of the Episcopal Missionary Church.

The Episcopal Missionary Church affirms the Holy Scriptures as containing all things necessary to salvation and as the ultimate rule and standard of faith. The church acknowledges the Nicene and Apostles' Creeds and the necessity of the Sacraments of Baptism and Holy Communion. It uses the 1928 American edition of the Book of Common Prayer or the Anglican Missal based upon it, and emphasizes the preservation of apostolic succession. The Episcopal Missionary Church embraces a variety of liturgical styles from low church to high church, evangelical to Anglo-Catholic.

The name Episcopal "Missionary" Church was selected as part of the church's desire to provide a home for all Episcopalians and other Christians who feel that they have been forced from their churches by the growth of liberalism within them. At present, the Episcopal Missionary Church has 27 parishes scattered throughout the United States.

In January 2020, the Episcopal Missionary Church endorsed a concordant of communion with the Anglican Church in North America (ACNA), which was signed by Archbishop Foley Beach and EMC Presiding Bishop William Millsaps on 14 September 2020.

Leadership
The current Presiding Bishop of the EMC and Bishop of the Diocese of the East is Vince McLaughlin. Bishops of the Episcopal Missionary Church are: William Millsaps, Bishop of the Diocese of the South, and a former chaplain of the University of the South in Sewanee, Tennessee; Vince McLaughlin, Presiding Bishop and Bishop of the Diocese of the East; Michael Pease; Peter N'gnanga (Missionary Bishop, Kenya); Frank Gentsch; Arthur Rushlow; Ibiso Igani; Wilbert Bailey; Doug Pieper, (Ret.); and Edward P. Whately (Ret.)  Other members of the leadership staff of the EMC include The Rev. Canon Charles Moncrief, Federal Chaplain Endorser; The Rev. Canon Dr. Brian Turner, Chancellor; and The Rev. Mary Marshall, Clerk. The EMC is exploring a relationship with an independent body, The Episcopal Missionary Church of South Africa, whose Presiding Bishop is Albert Shange.

References

External links
Episcopal Missionary Church
Federation of Anglican Churches in the Americas
Holy Cross Anglican Church, Franklin TN

Christian organizations established in 1992
Continuing Anglican denominations
Anglican denominations in North America
Anglicanism in the United States